Vera Zvonareva and Bob Bryan were the defending champions, but Zvonareva did not participate in this U.S. Open due to injury. Bryan partnered Rennae Stubbs, and the pair lost in the quarterfinals to Corina Morariu and Mike Bryan.

Daniela Hantuchová and Mahesh Bhupathi won the title, defeating Katarina Srebotnik and Nenad Zimonjić in the final 6–4, 6–2. With this win, Hantuchová completed the Career Grand Slam in Mixed Doubles, becoming the thirteenth player to complete this milestone.

Seeds

Draw

Finals

Section 1

Section 2

References 
Draw
2005 US Open – Doubles draws and results at the International Tennis Federation

Mixed Doubles
US Open (tennis) by year – Mixed doubles